Hampton's Legion was an American Civil War military unit of the Confederate States of America, organized and partially financed by wealthy South Carolina planter Wade Hampton III. Initially composed of infantry, cavalry, and artillery battalions, elements of Hampton's Legion participated in virtually every major campaign in the Eastern Theater, from the first to the last battle.

History

A legion historically consisted of a single integrated command, with individual components including infantry, cavalry, and artillery. The concept of a multiple-branch unit was never a practical application for Civil War armies and, early in the war, the individual elements were assigned to other organizations.

Organized by Wade Hampton in early 1861, Hampton's Legion initially boasted a large number of South Carolina's leading citizens, including future generals J. Johnston Pettigrew, Stephen Dill Lee, Martin W. Gary, and Matthew C. Butler. Originally, the Legion comprised six companies of infantry, two of cavalry, and one of light artillery. The infantry fought in the First Battle of Manassas, where Colonel Hampton suffered the first of several wounds during the war. In November 1861, the artillery was outfitted with four Blakely Rifles, imported from England and slipped through the Union blockade into Savannah, Georgia. By the end of the year, each element of the Legion had been expanded with new companies to bolster the effective combat strength.

With the reorganization of the Army of Northern Virginia in mid-1862, Hampton's Legion was broken up and reassigned. The cavalry battalion was consolidated with the 4th South Carolina Cavalry Battalion and two independent companies on August 22, 1862, and became the 2nd South Carolina Cavalry under Colonel Butler. It remained directly under General Hampton's control and served in his brigade and then division for the rest of the war. The artillery was converted to horse artillery and renamed Hart's Battery, after its commander, Capt. James F. Hart. Lt. Colonel Gary's infantry element, retaining the designation Hampton's Legion, was initially brigaded with Georgia troops in Stonewall Jackson's command, but was transferred in June to John Bell Hood's "Texas Brigade." The Legion served in General Longstreet's Corps through mid-1863 before being transferred with that Corps to the Army of Tennessee in September. On March 11, 1864, the infantry was mounted and assigned to General Gary's Cavalry Brigade and served in the Department of Richmond until January, 1865 when it was transferred to the Cavalry Corps, Army of Northern Virginia.

The various elements of the Legion fought in most of the major Eastern operations of 1862, including the Peninsula, Northern Virginia, and Maryland campaigns, suffering substantial losses. The Legion helped to dislodge the Yankees at the battle of Chinn Ridge, and the Second Battle of Bull Run, and to inflict a horrific number of casualties on the 5th New York Regiment. Battered at Antietam, the much depleted Legion infantry was sent to the rear and performed garrison duty for months while refitting and recruiting. It did not participate actively in the early part of the Gettysburg Campaign (unlike the cavalry and artillery elements, which played a major role in several battles during the campaign). It fought a minor rear-guard action at Boonsboro, Maryland, during the army's retreat from Gettysburg. It returned to action in the fall of 1863 in Longstreet's Corps during the Battle of Chickamauga and the subsequent Chattanooga campaign. The Legion infantry later returned to Virginia and in March 1864, it was converted to mounted infantry and assigned to Gary's Cavalry Brigade in the Department of Richmond. They served in that department, until January 1865 when the brigade was reassigned to Fitzhugh Lee's Cavalry Division. It harassed Federal supply depots throughout northern Virginia, and fought in several actions during the lengthy Siege of Petersburg.

What was left of the Hampton Legion infantry surrendered with General Robert E. Lee at Appomattox Court House in early April 1865. The South Carolina cavalry regiment and the horse artillery (by then renamed as Halsey's Battery after Hart's wounding) participated in the Carolinas Campaign with General Hampton and surrendered at Bennett Place in North Carolina along with the rest of General Joseph E. Johnston's forces on April 26.

Organization of the Legion

Original composition

Six companies of infantry:

Co. A Washington Light Infantry Volunteers (Charleston)
Co. B Watson Guards (Edgefield)
Co. C Manning Guards (Sumter)
Co. D Gist Riflemen (Anderson)
Co. E Bozeman Guards (Greenville)
Co. F Davis Guards (Greenville)

Cavalry battalion:

Co. A Edgefield Hussars (Edgefield)
Co. B Brooks Troop (Greenville)
Co. C Beaufort District Troop (Beaufort)

Artillery:

Washington Artillery (Charleston)

Additional units
Infantry:

Co. G Claremont Rifles (Statesburg) 19 Aug 1861 
Co. H (1st) German Volunteers (Charleston) 22 Aug 1861 
Co. H (2nd) South Carolina Zouave Volunteers 29 Jul 1862 
Co. I Capt. D.L. Hall's company 11 Nov 1862 
Co. K Capt. John H. Bowen's company 11 Nov 1862

Cavalry:

Co. D Congaree Troop (Columbia) 5 Aug 1861

Artillery:

Co. B German Artillery (Co. H (1st)) 1 Nov 1861

Major engagements
 First Manassas – infantry and cavalry (artillery was not outfitted with guns in time)
 Peninsular Campaign – all elements
 Seven Days Battles – all elements
 Second Manassas – all elements
 Sharpsburg – infantry
 Tennessee Campaign – infantry
 Gettysburg – cavalry and artillery
 Wilderness – primarily infantry
 Siege of Petersburg – all elements at various times
 Battle of Appomattox Court House – infantry
 Battle of Bentonville – cavalry and artillery

See also
List of South Carolina Confederate Civil War units
List of American Civil War legions
William Aiken Walker (1839-1921), American painter and member of Hampton's Legion

References
 The Hampton Legion (California; living history)
 The Hampton Legion (Germany; living history)
 The Hampton Legion (South Carolina; living history)
  Web Archive page: Hampton's Legion Artillery

Further reading
 Field, Ron, The Hampton Legion, Lower Swell, Gloucestershire, 1994, .
 Field, Ron, The Hampton Legion, Part 2, Company Histories, Lower Swell, Gloucestershire, 1995, .
 McArthur, Judith N. and Burton, Orville V., A Gentleman and an Officer: A Military and Social History of James B. Griffin's Civil War, Oxford University Press, USA, 1996, .
 Priest, John Michael, Ed., Stephen Elliott Welch of the Hampton Legion, White Mane Publishing Co. Inc. Shippensburg, PA, 1994, .
 Sifakis, Stewart (1995). Compendium of the Confederate Armies: South Carolina and Georgia. Facts on File. .
 Sturkey, O. Lee, A History of the Hampton Legion Infantry, Broadfoot Publishing Company, Wilmington, N.C., 2008, .
 Wells, Edward L. Hampton and His Cavalry in 64, originally published in 1899, Charleston, S.C. republished in 1991 by Owens Publishing Co. Richmond, VA. .
 William K. Bachman ordnance return and muster roll, W.S. Hoole Special Collections Library, The University of Alabama.

References

Units and formations of the Confederate States Army from South Carolina
Texas Brigade
Legions of the American Civil War
Military units and formations established in 1861
Military units and formations disestablished in 1865
1861 establishments in South Carolina